The 1982–83 Kent Football League season was the 17th in the history of the Kent Football League, a football competition in England. This season was the last with two points for a win system.
 
The league was won by Crockenhill, while Chatham Town was promoted to the Southern Football League.

League table

The league featured 15 clubs which competed in the previous season, along with two new clubs, transferred from the London Spartan League:
Alma Swanley
Beckenham Town

League table

References

External links

1982-83
1982–83 in English football leagues